William Tubbs (May 10, 1907 – January 25, 1953) was an American stage and film actor. He appeared in a number of European films in the years after the Second World War, including several by Roberto Rossellini.

Filmography

References

Bibliography
 Bondanella, Peter. The Films of Roberto Rossellini. Cambridge University Press, 1993.

External links

1907 births
1953 deaths
American male film actors
American male stage actors
Male actors from Milwaukee
20th-century American male actors